Sar Keyvan (also Romanized as Sar Keyvān and Sar-e Keyvān) is a village in Dalfard Rural District, Sarduiyeh District, Jiroft County, Kerman Province, Iran. At the 2006 census, its population was 65, in 16 families.

References 

Populated places in Jiroft County